is a television drama series based on the novel of the same title by ; it recounts the adventures of Momoko Hasegawa, played by Keiko Kitagawa, who possesses the ability to travel back in time upon contact with belongings of a deceased person with unfinished business in life. She then has the chance to prevent the death of the would-be deceased.

Plot
Momoko Hasegawa, a girl who dreams of being a wedding planner is transferred to Little Angels, a subsidiary company of her employer that provides funeral services, following a disastrous incident in a wedding ceremony at the hotel. She acquires the ability to travel back in time at the age of ten, when she is involved in a traffic accident but is saved by a mysterious woman, who passes the ability to her shortly before succumbing to her wound. Years later, she finally learns that the trigger to activating her ability is by touching an important item which belonged to a deceased person that held some sort of significance for them. She uses this ability to travel in time and prevents the death of the deceased persons she encounters on her line of work.

Cast
 Keiko Kitagawa as 
 Momoko is a young salary woman working for Little Angel, a funeral services provider that handles a variety of cases. Despite having a low-paying job and living in a rundown apartment, she is actually the daughter of a wealthy family in the hospital business. She has a special ability to travel back in time, which she acquired in a traffic accident at a young age. This ability only becomes fully developed after she is transferred to Little Angel, as it is revealed that touching mementos which hold great significance to the deceased would activate her time-travel abilities. Throughout the series, she attempts to use this ability to travel back in time to prevent the deaths of the would-be deceased persons with unfinished business. She is obsessed with muscles.
 Shōsuke Tanihara as 
 A senior colleague of Momoko in Little Angel. Shoutarou may be cruel towards Momoko sometimes, but has always come to Momoko's aid, often under threat by Momoko to reveal his secrets. He is especially interested in foreign ladies gaijin, a weakness exploited by Momoko to get him into helping her. He has a variety of skills, including picking locks, stealth infiltration, deception, and intelligence gathering; Momoko comments that he should "become a professional criminal" rather than being in the funeral business.
 Reina Asami as 
 Hina is Momoko's closest friend from high school who is a Haken at a publication company. Because of her connection, Momoko sometimes asks her for help when attempting to change the future/past, and she has proven to be very helpful in some cases.
 Sousuke Takaoka as 
 A colleague of Momoko. Akira thinks very little of Momoko, who he sometimes considers a burden, and is often seen criticizing Momoko at work. He also has a crush on Tamaki, who takes no interest in him.
 Jiro Sato as 
 The president of Little Angel. Shigeo is a soft-spoken, middle-aged man who is always smiling and caring towards his subordinates. He is sometimes criticized by Akira for being too tolerant to Momoko's strange behavior.
 Natsuna Watanabe as 
 Female high school student who works part-time at Little Angel. She is the subject of Akira's crush, and is often annoyed by Akira's attempts at asking her out.
 Shoko Ikezu as 
 Female colleague of Momoko. She is in charge of the general administration matters at Little Angels – something she takes great pride in. Her appetite is unrivaled.
 Magy as 
 The assistant police inspector.  He is continually flustered by his overbearing wife.
 Dr. Hirotaro Honda as 
 Momoko's father and the president of William Hasegawa Memorial Hospital.
 Mayumi Hori as the mysterious woman
 The mysterious woman appears only in flash back scenes. After saving a young Momoko from a potentially fatal traffic accident, she passes the ability of time-traveling to Momoko shortly before her succumbing to her injuries. Later revealed to be Hazuki Yoko the former girlfriend of Shoutarou Otomo. It's implied that Otomo may know about her ability.

Episode Ratings

External links
 

Japanese drama television series
2007 Japanese television series debuts
2007 Japanese television series endings
TV Asahi television dramas
Television shows based on Japanese novels